Fagerlund is a surname. It may refer to:

Jonathan Fagerlund (born 1991), Swedish singer, sometimes known just by the mononym Jonathan
Lennart Fagerlund (born 1952), Swedish cyclist
Reino Fagerlund (1953–2019), Finnish judoka
Rickard Fagerlund (1937-2009), Swedish ice hockey player and manager
Sebastian Fagerlund (born 1972), Finnish composer